Bellmawr is a borough in Camden County, in the U.S. state of New Jersey. As of the 2020 United States census, the borough's population was 11,707, an increase of 124 (+1.1%) from the 2010 census count of 11,583, which in turn reflected an increase of 321 (+2.9%) from the 11,262 counted in the 2000 census.

Bellmawr is home to the main post office for the area, one of the largest in the state of New Jersey, handling an average of 4.5 million pieces of mail daily.

Bellmawr joins Cranbury, Egg Harbor Township, Montclair and Woodbridge Township as one of the first five municipalities in the state that have authorized dispensaries to sell medical cannabis.

History 
Bellmawr was incorporated as a borough on March 23, 1926, from portions of the now-defunct Centre Township, based on the results of a referendum held on April 21, 1926.  The boroughs of Mount Ephraim, Runnemede and Lawnside were also created in the same two-day period. The borough was named for Ernest C. Bell, who owned a farm in the area.

In 1966, the Bellmawr Police Department investigated several officers for ticket fixing. The officers were ordered to cooperate with internal investigators and give statements and told that they would be fired if they refused to do so; upon answering the investigators' questions, the officers were criminally charged. In 1967, the Supreme Court of the United States ruled that the officers' self-incriminating statements violated the Fifth Amendment and Fourteenth Amendment, and that it was therefore unconstitutional to use their statements in a prosecution; the officers' convictions were overturned. The case, Garrity v. New Jersey, led to the creation of the Garrity warning, which advises government employees of their rights during internal investigations.

In late October 2001, the Bellmawr post office was closed due to possible anthrax contamination in the wake of the 2001 anthrax attacks. The office was re-opened several days later, in early November, after testing negative for anthrax.

Geography
According to the United States Census Bureau, the borough had a total area of 3.11 square miles (8.05 km2), including 2.98 square miles (7.73 km2) of land and 0.12 square miles (0.32 km2) of water (3.92%).

The borough borders the municipalities of Barrington, Brooklawn, Gloucester City, Haddon Heights, Mount Ephraim, and Runnemede in Camden County; and Deptford Township and Westville, both in Gloucester County.

Demographics

2010 census

The Census Bureau's 2006–2010 American Community Survey showed that (in 2010 inflation-adjusted dollars) median household income was $56,182 (with a margin of error of ± $3,809) and the median family income was $66,947 (± $3,353). Males had a median income of $47,251 (± $3,082) versus $39,932 (± $4,677) for females. The per capita income for the borough was $25,961 (± $1,460). About 7.3% of families and 9.9% of the population were below the poverty line, including 19.9% of those under age 18 and 4.0% of those age 65 or over.

2000 census
As of the 2000 United States census there were 11,262 people, 4,446 households, and 3,134 families residing in the borough. The racial makeup of the borough was 92.79% White, 1.18% African American, 0.06% Native American, 3.05% Asian, 0.02% Pacific Islander, 1.54% from other races, and 1.36% from two or more races. Hispanic or Latino of any race were 3.50% of the population.

There were 4,446 households, out of which 26.9% had children under the age of 18 living with them, 52.3% were married couples living together, 12.6% had a female householder with no husband present, and 29.5% were non-families. 25.3% of all households were made up of individuals, and 11.1% had someone living alone who was 65 years of age or older. The average household size was 2.53 and the average family size was 3.02.

In the borough the population was spread out, with 20.8% under the age of 18, 8.4% from 18 to 24, 28.8% from 25 to 44, 24.6% from 45 to 64, and 17.5% who were 65 years of age or older. The median age was 40 years. For every 100 females, there were 96.5 males. For every 100 females age 18 and over, there were 94.9 males.

The median income for a household in the borough was $44,653, and the median income for a family was $53,839. Males had a median income of $38,646 versus $27,050 for females. The per capita income for the borough was $19,863. About 2.6% of families and 4.0% of the population were below the poverty line, including 3.7% of those under age 18 and 5.2% of those age 65 or over.

Government

Local government
Bellmawr is governed under the Borough form of New Jersey municipal government, which is used in 218 municipalities (of the 564) statewide, making it the most common form of government in New Jersey. The governing body is comprised of a mayor and a six-member borough council, with all positions elected at-large on a partisan basis as part of the November general election. A mayor is elected directly by the voters to a four-year term of office. The Borough Council is comprised of six members elected to serve three-year terms on a staggered basis, with two seats coming up for election each year in a three-year cycle. The Borough form of government used by Bellmawr is a "weak mayor / strong council" government in which council members act as the legislative body with the mayor presiding at meetings and voting only in the event of a tie. The mayor can veto ordinances subject to an override by a two-thirds majority vote of the council. The mayor makes committee and liaison assignments for council members, and most appointments are made by the mayor with the advice and consent of the council.

, the Mayor of the Borough of Bellmawr is Democrat Charles J. "Chuck" Sauter III, whose term of office ends December 31, 2022. The members of the Bellmawr Borough Council are Raymond Bider (D, 2022), James P. "Jamie" Casey (D, 2022), James F. D'Angelo (D, 2023), Bill Evans (D, 2024;appointed to fill an unexpired term), Johann Fina (D, 2023) and Craig R. Wilhelm (D, 2024).

In December 2021, the Borough Council selected Bill Evans to fill the seat expiring in December 2024 that had been held by Steven Hagerty until he resigned from office.

In January 2016, Ray Bider was appointed to fill the seat expiring in December 2016 that became vacant following the resignation the previous month of Joshua Tregear, who was appointed to serve as Borough Administrator.

In October 2015, David Spector was appointed to fill the seat expiring in December 2016 that had been held by David M. Duncan until his death the previous month.

In November 2012, the council selected Joshua Tregear, from among a list of three candidates recommended by the Camden County Democratic Committee, to fill the vacant seat of Regina Piontkowski, who had resigned two months earlier after serving nearly 20 years in office.

Federal, state and county representation
Bellmawr is located in the 1st Congressional District and is part of New Jersey's 5th state legislative district.

Politics
As of March 2011, there were a total of 7,368 registered voters in Bellmawr, of which 3,416 (46.4% vs. 31.7% countywide) were registered as Democrats, 839 (11.4% vs. 21.1%) were registered as Republicans and 3,110 (42.2% vs. 47.1%) were registered as Unaffiliated. There were 3 voters registered as Libertarians or Greens. Among the borough's 2010 Census population, 63.6% (vs. 57.1% in Camden County) were registered to vote, including 79.9% of those ages 18 and over (vs. 73.7% countywide).

In the 2012 presidential election, Democrat Barack Obama received 3,064 votes (61.5% vs. 54.8% countywide), ahead of Republican Mitt Romney with 1,788 votes (35.9% vs. 43.5%) and other candidates with 63 votes (1.3% vs. 0.9%), among the 4,983 ballots cast by the borough's 7,875 registered voters, for a turnout of 63.3% (vs. 70.4% in Camden County). In the 2008 presidential election, Democrat Barack Obama received 3,124 votes (59.2% vs. 66.2% countywide), ahead of Republican John McCain with 1,985 votes (37.6% vs. 30.7%) and other candidates with 62 votes (1.2% vs. 1.1%), among the 5,275 ballots cast by the borough's 7,654 registered voters, for a turnout of 68.9% (vs. 71.4% in Camden County). In the 2004 presidential election, Democrat John Kerry received 3,277 votes (60.8% vs. 61.7% countywide), ahead of Republican George W. Bush with 2,034 votes (37.7% vs. 36.4%) and other candidates with 36 votes (0.7% vs. 0.8%), among the 5,389 ballots cast by the borough's 7,307 registered voters, for a turnout of 73.8% (vs. 71.3% in the whole county).

In the 2013 gubernatorial election, Republican Chris Christie received 63.0% of the vote (1,678 cast), ahead of Democrat Barbara Buono with 35.3% (939 votes), and other candidates with 1.7% (45 votes), among the 2,759 ballots cast by the borough's 7,921 registered voters (97 ballots were spoiled), for a turnout of 34.8%. In the 2009 gubernatorial election, Democrat Jon Corzine received 1,422 ballots cast (46.4% vs. 53.8% countywide), ahead of Republican Chris Christie with 1,348 votes (44.0% vs. 38.5%), Independent Chris Daggett with 170 votes (5.5% vs. 4.5%) and other candidates with 57 votes (1.9% vs. 1.1%), among the 3,066 ballots cast by the borough's 7,349 registered voters, yielding a 41.7% turnout (vs. 40.8% in the county).

Education
The Bellmawr School District serves public school students from pre-kindergarten through eighth grade. As of the 2019–20 school year, the district, comprised of three schools, had an enrollment of 1,225 students and 99.5 classroom teachers (on an FTE basis), for a student–teacher ratio of 12.3:1. Schools in the district (with 2019–20 enrollment data from the National Center for Education Statistics) are 
Bellmawr Park Elementary School with 476 students in grades Pre-K–4, 
Ethel M. Burke Elementary School with 248 students in grades K–4 and 
Bell Oaks Upper Elementary School with 484 students in grades 5–8.

For ninth through twelfth grades, public-school students attend Triton Regional High School in neighboring Runnemede, one of three high schools that are part of the Black Horse Pike Regional School District. The other communities in the district are Gloucester Township and Runnemede. As of the 2019–2020 school year, the high school had an enrollment of 1,154 students and 91.4 classroom teachers (on an FTE basis), for a student–teacher ratio of 12.6:1. The two other schools in the district are Highland Regional High School and Timber Creek Regional High School, which serve students from Gloucester Township, based on their address. The district is governed by a nine-member board of education that oversees the operation of the district; seats on the board are allocated to the constituent municipalities based on population, with one seat allocated to Bellmawr.

Students from Bellmawr, and from all of Camden County, are eligible to attend the Camden County Technical Schools, a countywide public school district that serves the vocational and technical education needs of students at the high school and post-secondary level at Gloucester Township Technical High School in the Sicklerville section of Gloucester Township or Pennsauken Technical High School in Pennsauken Township. Students are accepted based on district admission standards and costs of attendance and transportation are covered by the home district of each student.

Our Lady of the Sacred Heart Regional School in Barrington was formed in September 2008 through a merger of Bellmawr's Annunciation Regional School and Barrington's St. Francis de Sales Regional School. With an enrollment of about 150 students, the Roman Catholic Diocese of Camden announced in June 2009 that the newly combined school would be closed.

Transportation

Roads and highways 

The New Jersey Turnpike is the most prominent highway passing through Bellmawr. It crosses the southern part of the borough, and part of interchange 3 is located within Bellmawr. Both the interchange and the toll gate (which features six lanes at the gate) runs along the border with Runnemede. Bellmawr also hosts the interchange between the "North-South Freeway" (Route 42 / Interstate 76) and Interstate 295. Additional significant roads that pass through Bellmawr include Route 168 and a very small portion of U.S. Route 130. The only major county road that passes through Bellmawr is County Route 551 Spur in the western part of the borough.

Public transportation 
NJ Transit bus service is available in the borough on the 400 route between Sicklerville and Philadelphia.

Notable people 

People who were born in, residents of, or otherwise closely associated with Bellmawr include:

 Rob Andrews (born 1957), congressman who served for 24 years as the U.S. representative for New Jersey's 1st congressional district
 Mary Jane Barker (born 1953), 4-year-old girl who went missing along with her playmate's dog. Despite the initial suspicion of foul play, the death was ruled an accident; a case of starvation and exposure as Barker was unable to escape the closet.
 Walter Rand (1919–1995), politician who served in both the New Jersey General Assembly and New Jersey Senate who focused on transportation issues
 Joseph J. Roberts (born 1952), politician who served in the New Jersey General Assembly from 1987 to 2010, who was Speaker of the Assembly from 2006 to 2010
 Buddy Robinson (born 1991), professional ice hockey player with the Calgary Flames
 Eric Robinson (born 1995), ice hockey winger for the Columbus Blue Jackets of the National Hockey League

References

External links

 Bellmawr Borough municipal website
 Bellmawr School District
 
 School Data for the Bellmawr School District, National Center for Education Statistics
 Black Horse Pike Regional School District
 https://scholar.google.com/scholar_case?case=11740367822130829320&q=garrity+v.+new+jersey&hl=en&as_sdt=6,33&as_vis=1

 
1926 establishments in New Jersey
Borough form of New Jersey government
Boroughs in Camden County, New Jersey
Cannabis in New Jersey
Populated places established in 1926